Mirsad Gruda (born 13 May 1986) is a retired Albanian footballer who last played for Besëlidhja Lezhë in the Albanian First Division.

References

Albanian footballers
Kategoria Superiore players
Besëlidhja Lezhë players
People from Lezhë
1986 births
Living people
Association football forwards